Vincent Manase Mohenoa "Vinnie" Anderson (born 2 February 1979) is a New Zealand professional rugby league footballer who is player/coach for Villegailhenc-Aragon XIII in the Elite Two Championship.

Background
He is the elder brother of Louis and Fraser Anderson, and is a member of the Church of Jesus Christ of Latter-day Saints.

Early years
Anderson played for Northcote Tigers and Mount Albert Lions in the Auckland Rugby League competition before transferring to East Coast Bays Barracudas to play alongside his father Warrick. His father later coached the Barracudas to the 2003 Fox Memorial title.

New Zealand Warriors
Anderson debuted for New Zealand Warriors in Round 17 of the 2002 National Rugby League, playing against Cronulla at Toyota Park on 7 July 2002. That year the New Zealand went on to the 2002 NRL Grand Final, which they lost 30–8 to the Sydney Roosters. In 2003 he played  as New Zealand Warriors fell one victory short of a consecutive Grand Final appearance. At the end of 2003 Anderson made his International début for New Zealand national rugby league team in the 100th match between the New Zealand and the Australian team. Anderson also played  for the 2004 New Zealand Tri-Nations side. The campaign was unsuccessful although he did manage to score tries in all but one of the 4 test matches against Australia and Great Britain. The tour also saw the start of brother Louis Anderson's Test career. 
Before departing at the start of the 2005 NRL season for the Super League, Anderson had carved a reputation for tough tackling and good ball skills.

St Helens
Anderson signed St. Helens in 2005 after the Rugby Football League refused to register him as a London Broncos player because of the London sides financial problems at the time.
Anderson fit well into the St Helens flamboyant style of rugby league and formed a deadly right-hand side combination with Jamie Lyon and Darren Albert.  In his two years at St. Helens they finished as League Leaders in 2005 and then won both the Challenge Cup and Super League in 2006.

Warrington
Anderson joined Warrington in 2007 for £50,000. He was joined at Warrington in the 2008 season by brother Louis Anderson, who signed for the club from New Zealand Warriors. Anderson played  for Warrington in the 2009 Challenge Cup Final, scoring a try in the process of defeating Huddersfield 25–16. He played in the 2010 Challenge Cup Final victory over Leeds at Wembley Stadium.

Salford
Anderson joined Salford in 2011.

Carcassonne
Anderson joined AS Carcassonne following his release by Salford. He was involved in a controversial incident in 2013 when he received a five-match ban for punching during a Challenge Cup match against Workington Town.

References

External links

Profile at warringtonwolves.com
Profile at saints.org.uk
NRL profile

1979 births
Living people
AS Carcassonne players
East Coast Bays Barracudas players
Mount Albert Lions players
New Zealand national rugby league team players
New Zealand rugby league players
New Zealand expatriate sportspeople in England
New Zealand Warriors players
New Zealand Latter Day Saints
New Zealand sportspeople of Tongan descent
People educated at the Church College of New Zealand
Rugby league centres
Rugby league five-eighths
Rugby league locks
Rugby league players from Auckland
Salford Red Devils players
St Helens R.F.C. players
Villegailhenc Aragon XIII coaches
Villegailhenc Aragon XIII players
Warrington Wolves players